Stuart Gilmour (born 17 August 1977 in Broxburn) is a Scottish footballer who plays as a midfielder.

Gilmour began his career with Dundee United but made just one appearance, playing the whole match in the 1-0 Scottish Challenge Cup quarter-final away win over Clydebank in September 1995. Gilmour failed to appear in another matchday squad and was released the following close season. He subsequently played at Junior level, firstly with West Calder United, before signing for Whitburn in July 1998. Gilmour spent five years at Whitburn, winning the Scottish Junior Cup in 1999 and representing Scotland in junior internationals before retiring in 2003 at the age of 26.

References

External links

1977 births
Living people
Scottish footballers
Dundee United F.C. players
Scottish Junior Football Association players
Whitburn Junior F.C. players
West Calder United F.C. players
Association football midfielders